The Naigaon-Rebai or Naigawan-Rebai was one of the small estate of India during the period of the British Raj. It was a non-salute princely state in the Bundelkhand Agency. The state was founded in 1807 by Thakur Lakshman Singh. He received charter (sanad) to rule from the British Raj.

Origin and History
The ruler of Naigawan Rebai State belonged to Dauwa clan of Ahir (Yadav).

Early History 
The state was founded in 1807 by Lakshman Singh. He was a chieftain who rebelled against British. When the British took control of Bundelkhand, they asked the rebel chieftains to surrender and put a condition of giving jagirdari in return. He then obtained a charter (sanad) of five villages from the British Raj. He made Naigawan Rebai as the centre of the jagir. He died in 1808 and was succeeded by his son Kunwar Jagat Singh.

Kunwar Jagat Singh 
Kunwar Jagat Singh became chief of state in 1808 and was crowned with title of “Sawai”.

In 1850 it was held that Lakshman Singh's tenure was for life only, and that the holding should have been resumed on his death. Jagat Singh was, however, allowed to continue in possession and in 1862 this ruling was reversed and the jagirdar received an adoption sanad.

Kunwar Jagat Singh remained in power till he died in 1867. After that Larai Dulhaiya became the holder of state, she was widow of Jagat Singh, who succeeded in 1867.

Thakurani Larai Dulhaiya 
Larai Dulhaiya succeeded in 1867 with the sanction of Government, though no woman had before held the position of ruling chief in Bundelkhand. She had 6 cavalry, 51 foot soldiers and 1 cannon.

In 1893 Larai Dulhaiya adopted Kunwar Viswanath Singh, who was born in 1881 to a distant relative of the Naigawan Rebai Raj family : the adoption was sanctioned by the British Government and his right of succession to Thakurain Larai Dulhaiya was recognised.

Kunwar Vishwanath Singh 
Vishwanath Singh succeeded Thakurani Larai Dulhaiya in 1908. He was granted administrative power on the 8 March 1909. Vishwanath Singh expanded the Jagirdari, Now the area of state (jagir) was about 12-25 square miles, which included more than 12 villages and the revenue was Rs. 17,000. Vishwanath Singh married three times, all the three marriages being with the daughters of the Dauwa Ahir family in Sarila. He died on the 1st June 1935 and was succeeded by his adopted son Kunwar Ratan Singh, who was born on the 16th February 1913.

Kunwar Ratan Singh 
Kunwar Ratan Singh was most probably the last Jagirdar of Naigawan Rebai state. After the Independence, princely state was merged with Republic of India in 1949.

List of rulers
Thakur Lakshman Singh
Kunwar Jagat Singh
Thakurani Larai Dulhaiya
Kunwar Vishwanath Singh
Kunwar Ratan Singh

References

States and territories established in 1807
States and territories disestablished in 1949
1807 establishments in India
1949 disestablishments in India
Princely states of India